William Harvey (1578–1657) was an English physician who made the first exact description of blood circulation.

William, Will, Willie, Billie or Bill Harvey may also refer to:

Academics
William Harvey (priest) (1810–1883), English cleric and academic, amateur cricketer
William R. Harvey (born 1941), African American educator, academic administrator, and businessman
William F. Harvey, American law professor

Arts and entertainment
William Harvey (artist) (1796–1866), English wood-engraver 
William Alexander Harvey (1874–1951), English architect
Bill Harvey (bandleader) (1918–1964), American bandleader
William S. Harvey (1920–1993), American graphic designer and art director with Elektra Records

Military and intelligence
William Edwin Harvey (general) (1871–1922), lawyer and U.S. Army officer
William Frederick James Harvey (1897–1972), World War I flying ace
William King Harvey (1915–1976), CIA officer

Politicians

British Members of Parliament
William Harvey (1663–1731), MP for Appleby, Essex, Old Sarum, and Weymouth and Melcombe Regis
William Harvey (1689–1742), MP for Old Sarum
William Harvey (1714–1763), MP for Essex
William Harvey (1754–1779), MP for Essex
W. E. Harvey (William Edwin Harvey, 1852–1914), MP for North East Derbyshire 1907–1914

Other politicians
William Harvey (Canadian politician) (1821–1874), Canadian politician
William Humphrey Harvey (1869–1935), South Australian politician
William West Harvey (1869–1958), Justice of the Kansas Supreme Court
William Smith Harvey (1882–1954), South Australian politician
William Bruce Harvey (1906–1954), Canadian politician

Sports

Association football
Bill Harvey (footballer, born 1896) (1896–1972), English footballer (Sheffield Wednesday, Birmingham, Southend), manager (Birmingham, Chesterfield, Gillingham) and cricketer
Bill Harvey (footballer, born 1908) (1908–1978), English footballer for Barnsley, Chesterfield and Darlington
Bill Harvey (footballer, born 1920) (1920–2002), English footballer and manager of Luton Town and Grimsby Town
Willie Harvey (footballer) (1929–2014), Scottish footballer

Other sports
Bill Harvey (baseball) (1908–1989), American Negro leagues baseball player
Bill Harvey (Australian footballer) (1926–1957), Australian footballer with North Melbourne
Billie Harvey (1950–2007), racing driver
Willie Harvey Jr. (born 1996), American football linebacker

Others
William Harvey (officer of arms) (1510–1567), English herald and Norroy King of Arms
William Henry Harvey (1811–1866), Irish botanist
William Hope Harvey (1851–1936), "free silver" activist
Will Harvey (born 1967), entrepreneur
William Frederick Harvey (1873–1948), director of the Central Research Institute in India, vice president of the Royal Society of Edinburgh
W. F. Harvey (William Fryer Harvey, 1885–1937), English writer

Other uses
William Harvey (department store), a department store located in Guildford

See also
William Hervey (disambiguation)
Harvey Williams (disambiguation)